Reginald William Tricker (5 October 1904 – 1990) was an English footballer.

Playing career
Though born in Karachi, then part of British India, now in Pakistan, Tricker's family moved back to England in 1908 when he was four and he grew up in Suffolk. He started his career at non-league club Beccles Town before moving up to play for Luton Town and Charlton Athletic, turning professional at the latter.

In March 1927 he moved to Arsenal and made his Football League debut on 19 March 1927 against Everton. Tricker soon established himself at the club, with two goals in his fourth game for the club, in a North London derby match against Tottenham Hotspur on 7 May 1927. However, Tricker was not part of the side that lost the 1927 FA Cup Final against Cardiff City as he was cup-tied.

Despite his early success Tricker was one of many forwards at the club and failed to establish a place in the time during the 1927-28 and 1928-29 seasons, making just eight appearances over the two. In February 1929 he left Arsenal, having scored five goals in 12 appearances, for Clapton Orient. At Orient he served for five seasons and was the club's top scorer for three consecutive seasons between 1930-31 and 1932-33. In total he made 188 Football League appearances.

Personal life
After retiring from football, he became a schoolmaster, becoming Head of PE at Owen's School, Islington.

References

External links
 Profile at Arsenal F.C. website

English footballers
1904 births
1990 deaths
Beccles Town F.C. players
Luton Town F.C. players
Charlton Athletic F.C. players
Arsenal F.C. players
Leyton Orient F.C. players
Margate F.C. players
Ramsgate F.C. players
Footballers from Karachi
Association football inside forwards